Thunder Power is a Taiwanese automobile manufacturer that specializes in producing electric vehicles.

History
Thunder Power was founded in 2011, and originally started out in Taiwan. they are currently based in Hong Kong. In 2017, they finished their production plant in Guangzhou. They also have plants built in Catalonia, Spain, Hangzhou, China, and Ganzhou City, China. The design of Thunder Power's vehicles was penned by noted Italian design firm Zagato, and they have won the German Design Award in 2019.

Their first production vehicle was the EV, also called the TP. A Limited Edition of the vehicle was launched, and only 488 were produced. The car was designed by Dallara in Italy. Its dimensions are 4967 mm/1920 mm/1458 mm, a wheelbase is 2994 mm, and a weight of 1900 kg. It has a top charging speed of 375 miles per hour at a fast station, and will cost ¥1,298,000.

The Chloe is their second production vehicle. It has a 80 kWh battery, and dimensions of 2850 mm/1550 mm. It costs ¥100,000 in China and €13,000 in Europe.

Vehicles

Current models
ThunderPower currently has 2 production vehicles.

Concept Vehicles

See also
ChangJiang
Dial EV
GreenWheel EV
Qingyuan Auto
Suda (marque)

References

Electric vehicle manufacturers of China
Car brands
Car manufacturers of China
Chinese brands